is a Prefectural Natural Park in Fukuoka Prefecture, Japan. Established in 1950, the park spans the municipalities of Iizuka, Miyawaka, Ōnojō, Dazaifu, Chikushino, Hisayama, Umi, Sasaguri, and Sue.

See also
 Mount Hōman
 National Parks of Japan
 List of Places of Scenic Beauty of Japan (Fukuoka)

References

Parks and gardens in Fukuoka Prefecture
Protected areas established in 1950
1950 establishments in Japan